Teignmouth Lifeboat Station is the base for Royal National Lifeboat Institution (RNLI) search and rescue operations at Teignmouth, Devon in England. The first lifeboat was stationed in the town in 1851 but the station was closed from 1940 until 1990. Since 2006 it has operated an  inshore lifeboat (ILB).

History
The Shipwrecked Fishermen and Mariners' Royal Benevolent Society sent a lifeboat to Teignmouth in 1851. It was kept near the Custom House in an earlier boathouse on the beach. In 1854 the Benevolent Society transferred its lifeboats to the RNLI. A new boathouse was provided on The Den with the doors facing the harbour and the River Teign.

On 10 October 1907 the lifeboat Alfred Staniforth was launched to aid the schooner Tehwija which had run aground near the mouth of the river with eight crewmen on board. It took the lifeboat crew two attempts to row out over the bar at the mouth of the river into the heavy seas. The ship's crew were pulled off but within fifteen minutes the storm had completely wrecked the grounded ship. W.J. Burden, the Honorary Secretary of the lifeboat station, had gone out in the lifeboat to steer it while Coxswain George Rice and the bowman added extra power to the oars. Burden and Rice were both awarded RNLI Silver Medals for their work that day.

The RNLI started to deploy motor lifeboats after World War I which allowed stations to cover larger areas. The Henry Finlay was then left in the boathouse on standby through World War II but the station was closed permanently in July 1945.

On 3 November 1990 the RNLI reopened Teignmouth as an inshore lifeboat station. The old boathouse had been used as a café for a few years but was available for conversion back into a boathouse, which was completed in 1991.

Description
The boathouse is a single storey masonry building. The slate roof overhangs both sides by a considerable extent and is supported on upright posts. When it was refurbished for its 1991 reopening, a fund-raising gift shop was installed under the eastern overhang.

Large doors open onto the road. When the lifeboat is to be launched, a small County tractor (RNLI No. TA21; registration WCL 764X) pushes it on its 'bedstead' carriage down the road opposite to a slipway on the harbour.

Area of operation

Lifeboats
'ON' is the RNLI's sequential Official Number; 'Op. No.' is the operational number painted onto the boat.

Pulling and sailing lifeboats

Inshore lifeboats

See also
 List of RNLI stations

References

Bibliography

External links
 Official station website
 RNLI station information

Lifeboat stations in Devon
Teignmouth